The Export–Import Bank of the Republic of China (Chexim) is a state-owned enterprise of the Ministry of Finance of Republic of China. It primarily offers credit insurance for foreign investment originating in Taiwan. The company also insures against political risk such as nationalization, breach of contract, social unrest or war. Chexim is a member of Berne Union.

The bank is not related to the Beijing based Export–Import Bank of China.

History
The bank was established on 11 January 1979.

Organizational structures
 Department of Loan and Guarantee
 Department of Export Insurance
 Department of Finance
 Department of Administrative Management
 Department of Risk Management
 Department of Accounting
 Personnel Office
 Ethics Office
 Information Management Section
 Compliance and Legal Affairs Section

See also

 List of banks in Taiwan
 Ministry of Finance (Taiwan)

References

1979 establishments in Taiwan
Banks established in 1979
Banks of Taiwan
Export credit agencies
Government-owned companies of Taiwan